Iran participated in the 2013 Asian Youth Games was held in Nanjing from August 16, 2013 to August 24, 2013.

Competitors

Medal summary

Medal table

Medalists

Results by event

3x3 basketball

Boys

Aquatics

Diving

Boys

Swimming

Boys

Athletics

Boys

Girls

Football

Boys

Handball

Boys

Judo

Boys

Girls

Shooting

Boys

Girls

Table tennis

Boys

Girls

Taekwondo

Boys

Girls

References

External links
 Official website

Asian Youth Games
Nations at the 2013 Asian Youth Games
2013